Andrew Michael Mattison (August 5, 1948 – December 29, 2005) was a medical psychologist and researcher.  He performed influential research in both clinical and social aspects of sexology, as well as drug use.  He spent the majority of his career as a professor, practicing psychotherapist, and research scientist at the University of California, San Diego.

Early life 
Mattison was born in Brooklyn, NY. He graduated from Xaverian High School in 1966 and got his Bachelor's Degree in English Literature at Fairfield University. He graduated with a Master's in social work, from the Stony Brook University in New York. He received his Ph.D. from United States International University (now Alliant International University) in 1975, with the dissertation Onset of Erectile Dysfunction in Diabetic Males.  His best-known book was The Male Couple: How Relationships Develop, coauthored with his partner David McWhirter (March 29, 1932 - July 28, 2006).  The book argued that gay male relationships have particular tendencies distinct from other categories of sexual relationships, an innovative thesis that encouraged the growth of a new field, homosexuality studies.  However, the book was also used by anti-gay marriage activists in legal arguments, because it does not use heterosexuality as a model for understanding homosexuality.

Career 
Mattison later began studying the use of party drugs by gay men, a controversial subject, which eventually led to a more thorough investigation of drug use in general.  In 2000 he cofounded the University of California Center for Medicinal Cannabis Research, of which he was co-director until his death.

He died of stomach cancer at the age of 57.

References

External links
Obituary from the San Diego Union-Tribune.
Center for Medicinal Cannabis Research
https://books.google.pl/books?id=0sHWnt9WmRsC&pg=PA332&lpg=PA332&dq=mcwhirter+i+mattison+badania&source=bl&ots=plqPWOwE-7&sig=ACfU3U0vFZMrXw5TRbsrvpXOM6sogZHuzg&hl=pl&sa=X&ved=2ahUKEwjPnsm81oDnAhWLLVAKHY-6BLsQ6AEwAHoECB0QAQ#v=onepage&q&f=false

American psychiatrists
Cannabis researchers
University of California, San Diego faculty
American sexologists
1948 births
2005 deaths
Deaths from stomach cancer
Psychology writers on LGBT topics
United States International University alumni
American LGBT scientists
American gay writers
Gay scientists
20th-century American LGBT people
21st-century American LGBT people
LGBT psychologists